WANY (1390 AM) was a radio station licensed to Albany, Kentucky, United States. It was first licensed in 1958.

WANY was last owned by Pamela Allred, through the Albany Broadcasting Company. Its license was cancelled by the Federal Communications Commission on August 3, 2020, due to the station having been silent for more than a year.

References

External links
FCC Station Search Details: DWANY (Facility ID: 835)
FCC History Cards for WANY (covering 1957-1979)

ANY (AM)
ANY (AM)
Defunct radio stations in the United States
Radio stations established in 1958
1958 establishments in Kentucky
Radio stations disestablished in 2020
2020 disestablishments in Kentucky
ANY (AM)